Waheed Nadeem (Urdu: وحید ندیم; born January 7, 1987) is an Afghani footballer who currently plays for Toofaan Harirod F.C.He is national senior and u23 team player. He wears number 8 for the Afghanistan national football team and his club team Toofaan Harirod F.C.

International career

He debuted for Afghanistan in December 2009 in a South Asian Football Federation Championship, commonly known as the SAFF Championship against Maldives. He scored his debut international goal in March 2011, against Bhutan.

International goals
Scores and results list Afghanistan's goal tally first.

Honours

Afghanistan
SAFF Championship: 2013

External links

Afghan footballers
1987 births
Living people
Association football midfielders
Sportspeople from Herat
Afghanistan international footballers